Pseudonausibius is a genus of beetles in the family Silvanidae, containing the following species:

 Pseudonausibius africanus Halstead
 Pseudonausibius maximus Grouvelle

References

Silvanidae genera